Pornsak Pongthong (born 9 May 1987) is a Thai professional footballer who plays for Pattaya Dolphins United in Thai League 3.

Honours

Club
Sriracha 
 Thai Division 1 League Champions (1): 2010

References

External links
 Goal.com 
 Info.thscore.com
 

1987 births
Living people
Pornsak Pongthong
Pornsak Pongthong
Association football midfielders
Pornsak Pongthong
Pornsak Pongthong
Pornsak Pongthong
Pornsak Pongthong
Pornsak Pongthong
Pornsak Pongthong